Galen Hollenbaugh is a Democratic Party member of the Montana House of Representatives, representing District 81 since his appointment in December 2006. He was appointed by the Lewis and Clark County Commission after the resignation of the incumbent, Christine Kaufmann. Kaufmann had resigned her House seat on being appointed to the Senate to replace Ken Toole, who had resigned from the Senate following his election to the Montana Public Service Commission.

External links
Representative Galen Hollenbaugh official website
Montana House of Representatives - Galen Hollenbaugh official MT State Legislature website
Project Vote Smart - Representative Galen Hollenbaugh (MT) profile

Democratic Party members of the Montana House of Representatives
Living people
University of Montana alumni
Politicians from Missoula, Montana
Year of birth missing (living people)